The True-Born Englishman is a satirical poem published in 1701 by English writer Daniel Defoe defending King William III, who was Dutch-born, against xenophobic attacks by his political enemies in England. The poem quickly became a bestseller in England.

According to a preface Defoe supplied to an edition of 1703, the poem's declared target is not Englishness as such but English cultural xenophobia, against the cultural disturbance new immigrants from Continental Europe caused. Defoe's argument was that the English nation as it already existed in his time was a product of various emigrating European ethnic groups, from the Ancient Britons to Anglo-Saxons, Normans and beyond. It was therefore nonsensical to abuse newer arrivals since the English law and customs would assure their inevitable assimilation:

Extract 

This extract was used by historian and political scientist Benedict Anderson as an epigram for his 1983 book Imagined Communities discussing the origins of nationalism.

References

External links
 
 

English poems
Satirical works
1701 poems
1701 in England
Xenophobia
Works by Daniel Defoe
Works about race and ethnicity